Troy Michael Bienemann (born February 18, 1983) is a former American football tight end. He was signed by the New Orleans Saints as an undrafted free agent in 2006 out of Washington State.

Bienemann was born in Minneapolis, Minnesota, attended St. Francis High School, and lettered in football and basketball. As a junior, he was a first-team All-League selection. As a senior, he was named as the League co-Defensive Player of the Year, was a first-team All-Mid Peninsula selection, was named to the All-Metropolitan team, and was named to the PrepStar Far West Team.

External links
Arizona Cardinals bio
Washington State Cougars bio

1983 births
Living people
Players of American football from Minneapolis
American football tight ends
Washington State Cougars football players
New Orleans Saints players
Arizona Cardinals players